Frederikshavn forenede Idrætsklubber (also known as FfI or Frederikshavn fI) is a Danish sports club based in Frederikshavn. The club has branches in football, handball, swimming, gymnastics and wrestling.

The football team spent a total five seasons in the top-flight Danish 1st Division during the 1960s and 1970s. Its most famous player through time is Harald Nielsen.

Former players

  Frank Nielsen

References

External links
 Official website (football branch)
Frederikshavn fI at Danish Football Association

Football clubs in Denmark
Association football clubs established in 1931
1931 establishments in Denmark